Baghjeghaz-e Sofla (also Romanized as Bāghjeghāz-e Soflá; also known as Baghchehqāz-e Soflá and Bāghjeghāz-e Pā'īn) is a village in Qaflankuh-e Sharqi Rural District, Kaghazkonan District, Meyaneh County, East Azerbaijan Province, Iran. At the 2006 census, its population was 21, in 7 families.

References 

Populated places in Meyaneh County